Gustine may refer to:

 Gustine, California, a city in Merced County
 Gustine Airport
 Gustine High School
 Gustine, Texas, a town in Comanche County
 Gustine High School (Texas)
 Gustine Independent School District
 Gustine Lake, a lake in Pennsylvania

See also
Gustin (disambiguation)